William Randolph "Sonny" Hill (born July 22, 1936) is an American former announcer. He is a member of the Philadelphia Sports Hall of Fame, and current sports radio personality in Philadelphia, Pennsylvania. He also serves as an executive advisor for the Philadelphia 76ers. He is known as Mr. Basketball and "The Mayor of Basketball" in Philadelphia for founding the eponymous Sonny Hill League and for his many contributions to the game.

Biography

Early life 
Hill was born and raised in Philadelphia. After graduating from Northeast High School in 1955, he attended college for two years and then joined the Eastern Basketball League.

Hill is the father of filmmaker K. Brent Hill.

Broadcasting career 
Hill began his broadcast career in 1969 as a color commentator with Andy Musser for the Philadelphia 76ers. He was also a commentator with the NBA on CBS from 1973 until 1977. He has hosted a weekly show on SportsRadio 94 WIP since 1987.

The Sonny Hill League 
The Sonny Hill Community Involvement League is an amateur summer basketball organization in the Delaware Valley. The league was founded in 1968 as a safe haven from gang warfare and other violence. The league, which began as an extension of the Charles Baker Memorial League, today consists of more than 60 teams serving more than 800 student athletes.

Awards and honors 
 Hill received the Mannie Jackson Human Spirit Award from the Naismith Memorial Basketball Hall of Fame in 2008.

References

External links 
 
 Philadelphia Sports Hall of Fame profile

1936 births
Living people
American men's basketball players
American sports announcers
Basketball players from Philadelphia
Central State Marauders basketball players
National Basketball Association broadcasters
Philadelphia 76ers announcers